Giovanni Battista Visconti Aicardi, B. (1644 – 10 August 1713) was a Roman Catholic prelate who served as Bishop of Novara (1688–1713).

Biography
Giovanni Battista Visconti Aicardi was born in Milan, Italy in 1644 and ordained a priest in the Clerics Regular of Saint Paul on 4 April 1665.
On 31 May 1688, he was appointed during the papacy of Pope Innocent XI as Bishop of Novara.
On 8 June 1688, he was consecrated bishop by Carlo Pio di Savoia, Cardinal-Bishop of Sabina.
He served as Bishop of Novara until his death on 10 August 1713.

Episcopal succession

References

External links and additional sources
 (for Chronology of Bishops) 
 (for Chronology of Bishops) 

17th-century Italian Roman Catholic bishops
18th-century Italian Roman Catholic bishops
Bishops appointed by Pope Innocent XI
Clergy from Milan
1644 births
1713 deaths
Barnabite bishops